Michael Phayer (born 1935) is an American historian and professor emeritus at Marquette University in Milwaukee and has written on 19th- and 20th-century European history and the Holocaust.

Phayer received his PhD from the University of Munich in 1968 and joined Marquette's Department of History in 1970. He attained the rank of Professor in 1990 and retired in 2002. He is the Ida E. King Distinguished Visiting Scholar of Holocaust Studies at Stockton University. He has published numerous research articles and books relating to Nazi Germany, the Holocaust and the Catholic Church, including his most recent, Pius XII, the Holocaust, and the Cold War (2007). His previous work was The Catholic Church and the Holocaust, 1930–1965 (published in 2000).

Bibliography
 Michael Phayer, Sexual Liberation and Religion in Nineteenth Century Europe, Totowa, NJ, Rowman and Littlefield, 1977.  
 Michael Phayer, Protestant and Catholic Women in Nazi Germany, Detroit, Wayne State University Press, 1990. 
 Michael Phayer and Eva Fleischner, Cries in the Night: Women Who Challenged the Holocaust, Kansas City, Sheed & Ward, 1997.

External links
 Michael Phayer,  "Canonizing Pius XII. Why did the pope help Nazis escape?", Commonweal, May 9, 2003 / Vol. CXXX (9). 
 Michael Phayer, "'Et Papa tacet': the genocide of Polish Catholics", Commonweal, April 8, 2005 / Vol. CXXXII (7).

1935 births
Living people
21st-century American historians
21st-century American male writers
Historians of the Holocaust
Ludwig Maximilian University of Munich alumni
Marquette University faculty
Historians of the Catholic Church
American male non-fiction writers